In the mathematical theory of hypergraphs, a hedgehog is a 3-uniform hypergraph defined from an integer parameter . Equivalently it can be formed from a complete graph by adding a new vertex to each edge of the complete graph, extending it to an order-3 hyperedge.

The properties of this hypergraph make it of interest in Ramsey theory.

References

Hypergraphs
Parametric families of graphs